Ware für Katalonien  (English-language title: Goods For Catalonia) is an East German black-and-white film, directed by Richard Groschopp. It was released in 1959.

Plot
At 1959, the People's Police notices a strange occurrence: the local demand for optical instruments increases, while the orders from abroad sharply decrease. Several detectives launch an investigation, revealing that a West German criminal named Hasso Teschendorf has been forging documents and using them to illegally obtain the goods, which he sold to the Spanish Army and to customers in Barcelona. After a long hunt, the smuggler is arrested just before he manages to flee to West Berlin.

Cast
 Wilfried Ortmann as Hasso Teschendorf
 Fritz Diez as Captain Gerner
 Werner Dissel as doorman
 Peter Sturm as Mr. Dupont
 Gerd Michael Henneberg as businessman
 Manfred Krug as smuggler
 Eva-Maria Hagen as Marion Stöckel
 Hanna Rimkus as Sabine Falk
 Hartmut Reck as Schellenberg
 Heinz-Dieter Knaup as Hasselbach
 Ivan Malré as Bob Georgi
 Carola Braunbock as Charlotte Gansauge
 Dom de Beern as inspector
 Albert Garbe as Bachmann
 Herbert Grünbaum as Rösli
 Hubert Hoelzke as customer
 Walter Jupé as Erwin

Production
At 1957, the West German criminal Hasso Schützendorf organized a complex fraud: his partners, using forged documents, managed to take possession on the entire stock of optical instruments produced by the Zeiss factory in Jena, East Germany. He sold them to clients in Barcelona. Schützendorf managed to escape justice, settling in Spain, where he lived as a rich man until his death at 2003. The film Ware fur Katalonien was loosely based on this incident, although the villain "Hasso Teschendorf" was caught in the end.

Reception
Director Richard Groschopp was awarded the Art Prize of the German Democratic Republic in 1959 for his work on the film. He later received a letter from  Schützendorf, who wrote him "Dear Groschopp, please be more realistic next time... Arresting me just before reaching the Brandenburg Gate? Are you that deluded?"

The German film lexicon described the picture as "a well-made crime film, with notably good acting."

References

External links
 

1959 films
1959 crime films
German crime films
East German films
1950s German-language films
Films set in Berlin
German black-and-white films
Films directed by Richard Groschopp
1950s German films